Liswa Nduti (born 24 December 1974 in DR Congo) is a retired footballer from DR Congo.

Career

South Africa

Nduti played at Manning Rangers for eight years, making at least 15 appearances in each year. In his first season, 1996–97, Manning Rangers won the league championship.

In 2001, Nduti had a short experience as a goalkeeper at a 2002/03 game challenging Jomo Cosmos in spite of the fact he typically played as a defender or midfielder, pulling off some saves as the Mighty Maulers ran out 2-1 winners.

India

Heading to East Bengal towards late October 2005, the sweeper was gone from the Red & Gold Brigade early on, despite coach Subhash Bhowmick planning to experiment with him in different roles as they outclassed Air India 3-1 at the Federation Cup.

Vietnam

Known as 'Baby' in Vietnam, he was with TCDK SLNA towards the end of 2007, putting in what was seen as an imperious display as they outclassed Ha Noi ACB 2-0, receiving Man of the Match.

National team
Nduti had four caps for DR Congo, including in the African Nations Cup qualifying.

References

External links
 Nduti will consider SA offers 
 at National-Football-Teams

1974 births
Living people
Expatriate footballers in India
V.League 1 players
East Bengal Club players
Song Lam Nghe An FC players
Democratic Republic of the Congo international footballers
Manning Rangers F.C. players
Association football midfielders
Association football defenders
Expatriate soccer players in South Africa
Expatriate footballers in China
Expatriate footballers in Vietnam
Democratic Republic of the Congo expatriate footballers
Democratic Republic of the Congo footballers
Yanbian Funde F.C. players
21st-century Democratic Republic of the Congo people
Democratic Republic of the Congo expatriate sportspeople in China
Democratic Republic of the Congo expatriate sportspeople in South Africa
Democratic Republic of the Congo expatriate sportspeople in Vietnam